Katsifaras is a Greek surname. Notable people with the surname include:

 Apostolos Katsifaras (born 1959), Greek politician and governor of Western Greece, 
 Georgios Katsifaras (1935–2012), Greek politician and government minister, 

Greek-language surnames
Surnames